Boletina trivittata is a Palearctic species of  'fungus gnat' in the family Mycetophilidae. Members of this genus are found in a wider variety of habitats from wooded streams to wetlands and open moorland.  Adults have been  obtained in emergence traps in a range of situations including rotting wood and soil litter.

References

External links
 Images representing  Boletina at BOLD

Mycetophilidae
Insects described in 1818
Nematoceran flies of Europe